Amy Woodman (born 1 November 1984) is a British track and field athlete who competes in the long jump.

She was English National Long-jump champion in 2009 and 2010; English indoor long jump champion in 2009; and USA National Collegiate Champion (NCCA Division II) - Long jump in 2008.

Early life
Amy was born in 1984 and lived in the village of Clutton, Somerset from the age of two years.

Woodman studied Sport and Exercise Science at the University of Wales Institute, Cardiff, before winning a two-year scholarship to Ferris State University at Big Rapids, Michigan, USA.

Career

In March 2008 she represented Ferris State University, Michigan at the USA National Collegiate Championships (NCCA) which were held at Minnesota State University, Mankato. She won the US National Long jump championship by clearing 5.94 metres.

In February 2009, while training at Ferris State University, she visited the UK and won the Aviva UK National Long-jump championship at Sheffield with a distance of 6.40 metres.

Her personal best performances are 60 metres - 7.74 secs; 100 metres - 12 seconds; 200 metres - 24.86; high jump - 1.6 metres; long jump - 6.40 metres; triple jump - 11.04 metres.

References

External links
 Gallery - Zimbio images of Amy Woodman competing at the AVIVA European Trials & UK Championship - 13 February 2011; AVIVA Grand Prix February 20, 2010; AVIVA World Trials & UK Championships February 14, 2009; Norwich Union Trial & UK Championship July 12, 2008

1984 births
Living people
Sportspeople from Bristol
British female long jumpers
English female long jumpers
Ferris State University alumni
Alumni of Cardiff Metropolitan University